Catherine Brighid Livingstone, (born 17 September 1955) is an Australian businesswoman who has held positions in the Commonwealth Bank of Australia, CSIRO, Macquarie Bank and Telstra.

Professional
After finishing her degree in 1977, Livingstone joined the accountancy firm of Price Waterhouse, working in both Sydney and London. She then held several accounting and management roles at Nucleus Ltd, finally reaching the position of Chief Executive, Finance, before being made the CEO of one of its subsidiaries, Cochlear Limited, in 1994. A year later she floated the company for $125m on the Australian Stock Exchange.

Livingstone has been an independent voting director of the Macquarie Bank and the Macquarie Group and a director of Future Directions International. She remains a non-executive director of WorleyParsons and a member of the Business/Industry/Higher Education Collaboration Committee.

Previously, she was the CSIRO chair from 2001 to 2006, director of the Sydney Institute from 1998 to 2005, director of the Rural Press Foundation, chair and director of the Australian Business Foundation from 2000 to 2005, and the chair of Telstra from 2009 to 2016.

On 22 January 2008, it was announced that Livingstone would be a member of the panel conducting the review of Australia's national innovation system.

In March 2014, she was elected president of the Business Council of Australia for a two-year term, replacing Tony Shepherd. She was succeeded by Grant King in November, 2016.

In 2014, she was elected a Fellow of the Australian Academy of Science (FAA).

In December 2015, Livingstone was announced as the successor to Professor Vicki Sara as the Chancellor of the University of Technology Sydney (UTS). She officially became the Chancellor of UTS on 1 December 2016.

Livingstone replaced David Turner as chairman of the Commonwealth Bank of Australia in January 2017.

Awards
Livingstone was awarded the title of the Eisenhower Exchange Foundation Fellow for Australia in 1999.

She became an Officer of the Order of Australia in 2008, "for service to the development of Australian science, technology and innovation policies, to the business sector through leadership and management roles and as a contributor to professional organisations".

References

External links
 Future Directions International
 Australian Business Foundation

Living people
1955 births
People from Nairobi
Australian people of British descent
Australian women in business
Commonwealth Bank people
Kenyan emigrants to Australia
Kenyan people of British descent
Kenyan expatriates in Australia
White Kenyan people
Fellows of the Australian Academy of Science
Macquarie University alumni
Academic staff of the University of Technology Sydney
Fellows of the Australian Academy of Technological Sciences and Engineering
Officers of the Order of Australia